Arco is a city in Butte County, Idaho, United States. The population was 879 as of the 2020 United States census, down from 995 at the 2010 census. Arco is the county seat and largest city in Butte County.

History 
A suspension bridge that crossed the Big Lost River funneled traffic through the settlement. The town leaders applied to the U.S. Post Office for the town name of "Junction".

The Postmaster General thought the name too common and suggested that the place be named Arco for Georg von Arco (1869–1940) of Germany who was visiting Washington, D.C., at the time. Georg von Arco was an inventor and a pioneer in the field of radio transmission and would become the lead engineer of Telefunken, a German company founded in 1903 that produced radio vacuum tubes. The town later moved four miles southeast when the stage station was moved to Webb Springs at Big Southern Butte. When the Oregon Short Line Railroad arrived from Blackfoot in 1901 the stage lines became obsolete and the town of Arco moved northwest to its present site.

Arco was the first community in the world ever to be lit by electricity generated solely by nuclear power. This occurred for about an hour on July 17, 1955, powered by Argonne National Laboratory’s BORAX-III reactor at the nearby National Reactor Testing Station (NRTS), now the Idaho National Laboratory. NRTS made further history on January 3, 1961, when the SL-1 reactor was destroyed through an operator maintenance error, with the ensuing steam explosion causing the deaths of all three personnel present.  It was the world's first and the United States' only fatal reactor accident.

Economy 
The town's economic base is primarily derived from the Idaho National Laboratory (formerly the Idaho National Engineering Laboratory or INEL), agricultural products, and recreation in the Lost River Valley.

Highways
 US 20 — to Mountain Home (west) and Idaho Falls (east)
 US 26 — to Shoshone (west) and Blackfoot (east)
 US 93 — to Challis (north) and Twin Falls (south)

Geography

Arco is located along the Big Lost River and is a gateway to the Lost River Range from the Snake River Plain. Craters of the Moon National Monument is located along U.S. Route 20, southwest of the city. The Idaho National Laboratory (INL) is located east of Arco.

Arco Peak, located two mile north of the community at an elevation of 7547 feet, rises 2220 feet above the city.

In town, the most striking physical feature is Number Hill, a rocky hill with numbers painted all over it. Butte County High School has a tradition of each class since 1920 painting its graduation year on the face of hill.

Climate

Demographics

2010 census
As of the 2010 United States Census of 2010, there were 995 people, 417 households, and 254 families living in the city. The racial makeup of the city was 95.1% White, 0.3% Native American, 0.3% Asian, 1.7% from other races, and 2.6% from two or more races. Hispanic or Latino of any race were 3.0% of the population.

There were 417 households, of which 30.2% had children under the age of 18 living with them, 44.4% were married couples living together, 13.2% had a female householder with no husband present, 3.4% had a male householder with no wife present, and 39.1% were non-families. 34.1% of all households were made up of individuals, and 15.9% had someone living alone who was 65 years of age or older. The average household size was 2.35 and the average family size was 3.03.

The median age in the city was 41.2 years. 26.9% of residents were under the age of 18; 6.1% were between the ages of 18 and 24; 21.6% were from 25 to 44; 26.1% were from 45 to 64; and 18.9% were 65 years of age or older. The gender makeup of the city was 51.8% male and 48.2% female.

2000 census
As of the 2000 United States Census of 2000, there were 1,026 people, 427 households, and 269 families living in the city. The racial makeup of the city was 95.13% White, 0.49% African American, 1.36% Native American, 1.75% from other races, and 1.27% from two or more races. Hispanic or Latino of any race were 3.61% of the population.

There were 427 households, out of which 29.3% had children under the age of 18 living with them, 48.2% were married couples living together, 11.9% had a female householder with no husband present, and 37.0% were non-families. 34.0% of all households were made up of individuals, and 15.2% had someone living alone who was 65 years of age or older. The average household size was 2.35 and the average family size was 3.04.

In the city, the population was spread out, with 27.9% under the age of 18, 6.8% from 18 to 24, 22.4% from 25 to 44, 25.8% from 45 to 64, and 17.1% who were 65 years of age or older. The median age was 40 years. For every 100 females, there were 91.8 males. For every 100 females age 18 and over, there were 90.7 males.

The median income for a household in the city was $27,993, and the median income for a family was $34,688. Males had a median income of $34,688 versus $17,386 for females. The per capita income for the city was $14,744. About 19.6% of families and 22.6% of the population were below the poverty line, including 33.8% of those under age 18 and 15.8% of those age 65 or over.

Notable residents
 C. A. Bottolfsen, Governor of Idaho, (1939–1941, 1943–1945)
 Warren Jones — justice, Idaho Supreme Court, valedictorian of Butte County High School in 1961

See also

Idaho National Laboratory
Borah Peak
Lost River Range
Big Lost River
Salmon-Challis National Forest
Snake River Plain
Craters of the Moon National Monument and Preserve
Big Southern Butte
Blizzard Mountain Ski Area
Butte County High School

References

External links

 1949 Life Magazine Photos

Cities in Butte County, Idaho
Cities in Idaho
County seats in Idaho
1955 establishments in Idaho
Articles containing video clips